John Hughes III (born April 27, 1988) is a former American football defensive tackle. He was drafted by the Cleveland Browns in the third round in the 2012 NFL Draft. He played college football at Cincinnati.

High school career
John Hughes attended Gahanna Lincoln High School in Gahanna, Ohio. Hughes played tight end at Gahanna Lincoln and was initially recruited by colleges as either a tight end or defensive end. A three-star prospect according to Rivals.com, Hughes accepted a scholarship from the University of Cincinnati. Hughes is the second player ever to be drafted in the NFL from Gahanna Lincoln. Robert James White was the first in 1953 to the Baltimore Colts.

College career
Hughes accepted a scholarship from the University of Cincinnati, playing defensive tackle for the Bearcats. With his coaches acknowledging his rare combination of size, speed, and power, Hughes switched to defensive tackle upon his arrival at the University of Cincinnati. A four-year contributor and two-year starter for the Bearcats, Hughes became a disruptive force along the defensive line. In his senior season alone, Hughes recorded 12.5 tackles for loss and 5 quarterback sacks. Upon completing his collegiate career, Hughes was awarded the Ray Sheakley Most Improved Leader Award as well as the John Pease Outstanding Lineman Award.

Professional career

Cleveland Browns
Hughes was invited to the 2012 NFL Combine upon completion of his impressive collegiate career. Hampered by a hamstring injury, Hughes had limited participation at the Combine.

Hughes was drafted 87th overall by the Cleveland Browns in the third round of the 2012 NFL Draft. Hughes earned his first professional sack against the Cincinnati Bengals on September 16, 2012.

On March 13, 2015, Hughes signed a four-year, $14.4 million contract extension.

On September 20, 2016, Hughes was released by the Browns.

New England Patriots
On September 27, 2016, Hughes was signed by the New England Patriots. He was released on October 1, 2016.

Tampa Bay Buccaneers
On October 3, 2016, Hughes was signed by the Tampa Bay Buccaneers He was released on December 10, 2016 but was re-signed three days later.

New Orleans Saints
On August 12, 2017, Hughes was signed by the New Orleans Saints. He was released on September 2, 2017. He was re-signed on October 4. He was released by the Saints on November 6 and re-signed on November 8, 2017. He was placed on injured reserve on December 27, 2017 after suffering a torn biceps in Week 16.

Buffalo Bills
On July 26, 2018, Hughes signed a one-year contract with the Buffalo Bills. Hughes was released by the Bills on August 12, 2018.

References

External links
 
 Cleveland Browns bio
 Cincinnati Bearcats bio

1988 births
Living people
American football defensive tackles
American football defensive ends
Lincoln High School (Gahanna, Ohio) alumni
Cincinnati Bearcats football players
Cleveland Browns players
New England Patriots players
Tampa Bay Buccaneers players
New Orleans Saints players
People from Franklin County, Ohio
Buffalo Bills players